The following is a list of locomotives of the London and North Eastern Railway as of 31 December 1947. This date is significant because nationalisation of the Big Four occurred the next day, 1 January 1948. Thus this is the list of locomotives as inherited by British Railways. At this time there were approximately 6300 steam locomotives, four diesel electric shunters and one petrol mechanical shunter.

At the time, departmental stock carried numbers within the capital stock series, so are listed there.

The numbering at this time fully reflected the LNER 1946 renumbering scheme, which had grouped most classes into single number blocks. BR allocated numbers in March 1948 (in the meantime there were a few withdrawals and new construction).  Most ex-LNER engines had 60000 added to their numbers, with a few exceptions.

In terms of locomotive taxonomy, the LNER had a superficially simple classification system that got a bit messy under close examination. Where it has been considered prudent therefore, subclasses have been identified rather than classes in order to link to the appropriate articles. The classifications given are the one in use at the time; i.e. reflects changes in classification up to that point but not subsequently.

Willie Yeadon gives full allocations for this date in his book LNER locomotive allocations: 1947: the last day (Irwell Press, 1989). This list is also repeated in the book LNER 150, and can be derived from Longworth.

List of locomotives

See also 

 List of GWR locomotives as of 31 December 1947
 List of LMS locomotives as of 31 December 1947
 List of SR locomotives as of 31 December 1947
 Steam locomotives of British Railways

2
British railway-related lists